Thomas Matthew Ransley  (born 6 September 1985) is a retired British rower. At the 2016 Summer Olympics in Rio de Janeiro he was part of the British crew that won the gold medal in the eight, was twice a World Champion and in 2015 was the European Champion in the men's coxless four.

Early life 
Ransley attended Dulwich Preparatory School in Cranbrook, Kent. Following this, he went to The King's School, Canterbury and then went into higher education at the University of York and the University of Cambridge.

Rowing career and achievements
Ransley was part of the British squad that topped the medal table at the 2011 World Rowing Championships in Bled, where he won a silver medal as part of the eight with Nathaniel Reilly-O'Donnell, Cameron Nichol, James Foad, Alex Partridge, Moe Sbihi, Greg Searle, Daniel Ritchie and Phelan Hill.

Ransley competed at the 2013 World Rowing Championships in Chungju, where he won a gold medal as part of the eight with Daniel Ritchie, Alex Gregory, Pete Reed, Moe Sbihi, Andrew Triggs Hodge, George Nash, Will Satch and Phelan Hill. The following year he competed at the 2014 World Rowing Championships in Bosbaan, Amsterdam, where he won a gold medal as part of the eight with Nathaniel Reilly-O'Donnell, Matthew Tarrant, Will Satch, Matt Gotrel, Pete Reed, Paul Bennett, Constantine Louloudis and Phelan Hill.

The following year he was part of the British team that topped the medal table at the 2015 World Rowing Championships at Lac d'Aiguebelette in France, where he won a bronze medal as part of the coxless four with Scott Durant, Alan Sinclair and Stewart Innes. He won a bronze medal at the 2018 World Rowing Championships in Plovdiv, Bulgaria, as part of the eight with Alan Sinclair, Thomas George, Moe Sbihi, Oliver Wynne-Griffith, Matthew Tarrant, Will Satch and Henry Fieldman.

Ransley was set to compete at the 2020 Summer Olympic Games in Tokyo, but after the postponement of the games he announced his retirement from international rowing in April 2020.

Olympic Games
2012 London – Bronze, Men's Eight
2016 Rio de Janeiro – Gold, Men's Eight

World Championships
2010 Karapiro – Silver, Men's eight
2011 Bled – Silver, Men's eight
2013 Chungju – Gold, Men's eight
2014 Amsterdam – Gold, Men's eight
2015 Aiguebelette – Bronze, Men's coxless four
2018 Plovdiv – Bronze, Men's eight

World Cups
2009 Banyoles – Bronze, Eight
2009 Munich – Bronze, Eight
2011 Munich – Silver, Eight
2011 Lucerne – Bronze, Eight
2012 Belgrade – Silver, Eight
2012 Lucerne – Silver, Eight
2012 Munich – Bronze, Eight

World University Rowing Championships
2008 Bronze – Coxless four

References

External links

 Tom Ransley at British Rowing
 
 
 

1985 births
Living people
English male rowers
People from Ashford, Kent
Rowers at the 2012 Summer Olympics
Rowers at the 2016 Summer Olympics
Olympic rowers of Great Britain
Olympic bronze medallists for Great Britain
Olympic gold medallists for Great Britain
Olympic medalists in rowing
Medalists at the 2012 Summer Olympics
Medalists at the 2016 Summer Olympics
People educated at The King's School, Canterbury
Alumni of the University of York
Alumni of Hughes Hall, Cambridge
Cambridge University Boat Club rowers
Sportspeople from Kent
British male rowers
World Rowing Championships medalists for Great Britain
Members of the Order of the British Empire
Alumni of the University of Cambridge